Mazer may refer to:

Mazer (drinking vessel), a type of Germanic drinking vessel crafted from the 13th to the 16th centuries
Mazer Rackham, a fictional character from Orson Scott Card's Ender's Game series
Bill Mazer, a famous American sportscaster
Norma Fox Mazer, author of books for children and young adults
Johan Mazer, Swedish musician
Mazer (video game), a 1996 video game by American Laser Games
Mazer Zaouia, a village in El Oued Province, Algeria

See also
 Maser, a device that emits microwaves by stimulated emission, similar to a laser but using a longer wavelength.
 Mazar (disambiguation)
 Mazor (disambiguation)
 Mazur (disambiguation)